Children of the Corn is a 2009 supernatural slasher film directed, written and made for television by Donald P. Borchers. It is based on the 1977 short story of the same name by Stephen King, the eighth installment of the film series, and a remake of the 1984 film. Set primarily in 1975 in the fictional town of Gatlin, Nebraska, the film centers on traveling couple Burt and Vicky as they fight to survive a cult of murderous children who worship an entity known as He Who Walks Behind the Rows, which had years earlier manipulated the children into killing every adult in town.

Plot

In 1963, the town of Gatlin, Nebraska, suffers a severe drought. In a tent, a boy preacher claims that an Old Testament-era Canaanite god, whom he calls "He Who Walks Behind the Rows" has spoken to him in his dreams. He tells the other children that the sinful adults are the reason for the drought, prompting them to kill everybody over nineteen in town. They then establish a death cult with the prime rule that one must be sacrificed to the cult's god upon reaching the age of nineteen.

Twelve years later, a bickering couple, Vietnam veteran Burt and his wife Vicky, are driving near Gatlin, planning their second honeymoon. A boy named Joseph stumbles out of the roadside corn in front of their car. After running Joseph over, Burt realizes the boy's throat was slashed. Wrapping and placing the body in the trunk, Burt tells Vicky to wait for him while he looks around. In the cornfield, Burt finds Joseph's bloodied suitcase. He and Vicky drive off searching for aid, not realizing they are being watched by Isaac, the nine-year-old current cult leader, and 18-year-old warrior Malachai.

Burt and Vicky reach an abandoned gas station after hearing a group of children giving an evangelical sermon over the radio. Finding the phones non-functional, Burt decides to go to Gatlin. While Burt drives, Vicky finds an amulet she recognizes as a pagan creation. Meanwhile, in the cornfields, Isaac tells the others about Burt and Vicky and that they, like the "blue man" (a police officer crucified for trying to stop them), must be killed to appease He Who Walks Behind the Rows, who demanded Joseph be killed for trying to escape.

Reaching the town, Burt and Vicky find it seemingly abandoned, with a calendar in a bar still reading 1963. Coming across a church with a sermon board dated last week, Burt goes in to investigate, ignoring Vicky's pleas that they should leave. Inside the church, Burt finds various occult drawings, a larger version of the trinket in Joseph's suitcase, and a book listing the birthdays of the town's inhabitants.

As Burt reads the book, Vicky is surrounded and attacked by Malachai and several other boys. She manages to kill one of them with Burt's shotgun before Malachai stabs her. Burt rushes outside just as Malachai blows the car up. Chased by the children into an alleyway, Burt is taunted by Isaac, who throws a knife at him, hitting him in the arm. Killing two of the older boys, Burt runs off into the cornfields.

In the alleyway, Isaac confronts Malachai, telling him that he angered He Who Walks Behind The Rows by spilling Joseph's blood in the corn. Questioning Malachai's faith, Isaac has him pray before they regroup with their followers, who they tell must sacrifice Burt in the clearing where the blue man's corpse is held. Malachai and the children begin hunting Burt through the corn.

Malachai is told by Nahum, one of the younger boys, that he had a vision of He Who Walks Behind the Rows, leading Malachai to believe Nahum will be the new prophet after Isaac. Malachai mentions that they must finish the search before dark, as that is He Who Walks Behind the Rows' time.

Burt begins having flashbacks to Vietnam and kills several of the children, including Nahum. At nightfall, the worshipers abandon the search and return to the town. They have a feast prepared by the females, who seem concerned that Burt was not apprehended. Later that night, Isaac holds a sermon in the church based on the tenet of "be fruitful and multiply" and proclaims that the time of fertilization has come. He beckons a teenage girl and boy up to the front of the church, and they immediately disrobe and have sex in front of the entire congregation.

Burt, lost and delusional, has visions of all those he has killed and begins wandering around aimlessly, searching for the road as the plant life begins attacking him. He finds the clearing and discovers Vicky's corpse, made into a scarecrow. Hallucinating that she is talking to him, Burt is faced by He Who Walks Behind the Rows, who proceeds to disembowel him and rip his eyes out in the form of ritual sacrifice.

The next day, Isaac tells the children that He Who Walks Behind The Rows is displeased with their inability to kill Burt, of whom He had to dispose Himself like the blue man (who, when killed, reduced the "age of favor" from twenty to nineteen). Isaac informs everyone that the age of sacrifice is now eighteen as punishment for their failure. After the children leave, Isaac stands in front of a pile of the children's bodies and, as he sets them on fire shouts, "Scarecrow!" The scarecrow is revealed to be Burt.

Later, Malachai and the other eighteen-year-olds enter the cornfields at dusk, offering themselves to He Who Walks Behind the Rows. While saying goodbye, Malachai's pregnant lover Ruth, whose faith had earlier been shaken, has a vision of herself setting fire to the corn.

Cast
 David Anders as Burt
 Kandyse McClure as Vicky
 Remington Jennings as Joseph / Ahaz
 Daniel Newman as Malachai
 Preston Bailey as Isaac
 Alexa Nikolas as Ruth
 Robert Gerdisch as Preacher Boy
 Jordan Schmidt as Bloody Knife Boy
 Isabelle Fuhrman as additional voices
 Leo Howard as additional voices

Production

Writing
While working on the 1984 film as a producer, Donald P. Borchers was originally content with it, though in hindsight came to believe it was too "Hollywoodized" and not true enough to the original short story. Wanting Stephen King to be involved in the production of the new film, Borchers sent a copy of the script to him, only to receive a letter from King's attorney stating that King wanted no part in the film; however, when attempting to sort out writing credits, Borchers sent a DVD copy to Stephen King who watched the film and approved writing credits, i.e "he did not ask to have his name removed or substitute it with an alias."

Filming
Casting started two weeks before production began. Unlike in the original film, in which the bulk of the cultists were portrayed by actors over eighteen, Borchers decided to cast age-appropriate actors. Borchers has stated that dealing with the largely underage cast proved to be the most difficult part of making the film.

The film was written, directed and produced by Donald Borchers, a producer on the original film, which was filmed in Lost Nation, Iowa and Rural Oxford Jct area. Borchers said he chose the Quad Cities Iowa/Illinois area after receiving a recommendation from the Iowa Film Office in the state Department of Economic Development. Shooting took place in and around the Quad Cities during September 2008.

Release
The film premiered on Syfy on September 26, 2009 and was released uncut on DVD by Anchor Bay on October 6. The DVD included such features as interviews with cast and crew and behind-the-scenes footage. A Blu-ray release followed on November 16, 2010.

See also
 Children of the Corn (film series)
 List of adaptations of works by Stephen King

References

External links 
 
 
 

2009 television films
2009 horror films
American horror television films
Children of the Corn
Films about religion
Films set in Nebraska
Films set in 1963
Films set in 1975
Films shot in Iowa
American road movies
American slasher films
2000s road movies
2000s slasher films
Syfy original films
Remakes of American films
Horror film remakes
2009 films
Films based on works by Stephen King
Films scored by Jonathan Elias
Television shows based on works by Stephen King
2000s English-language films
2000s American films